Jason Getsy (October 3, 1975 – August 18, 2009) was a convicted murder-for-hire triggerman in the American state of Ohio. He was executed at the age of 33 for a murder committed when he was 19.

Murder
Getsy was hired by John Santine  for US$5,000 to kill Charles Serafino, as well as any and all potential witnesses to the crime, in an argument over a lawn care business. On July 7, 1995, Getsy killed Charles Serafino's mother, 66-year-old Ann Serafino, in Hubbard, Ohio, and shot Charles seven times, including once in the face at point-blank range. Charles Serafino, however, survived the shooting. Getsy was 19 years old at the time of the murder.

Conviction
Getsy was convicted of aggravated murder and sentenced to death. The Ohio Parole Board voted 5–2 in favor of clemency because other people convicted in the same slaying were not sentenced to die. Ohio Governor Ted Strickland rejected the finding of the Parole Board after appeals to the Supreme Court of Ohio and the Supreme Court of the United States failed.

Execution
Getsy was executed by lethal injection on Tuesday August 18, 2009, at 10:00 a.m. in the death chamber of the Southern Ohio Correctional Facility in Lucasville, Ohio. He was pronounced dead at 10:29 a.m. In an apology made prior to his execution, Getsy stated, "To Chuck and Nancy Serafino and your loved ones, for all the pain I have caused you it is my earnest prayer that God grants you peace. I am sorry. It is a little word, I know, but it is true. For everyone else, God is so great that He gave His only son that I may be forgiven of all my sins. Even today I can say how blessed I am that the Holy Spirit lives in me."

See also
 Capital punishment in Ohio
 Capital punishment in the United States
 List of people executed in Ohio
 List of people executed in the United States in 2009

References

External links

 WFMJ news report
 Time.com news report
 Associated Press report
 Clark County Prosecutor's synopsis of the Getsy case
 Tribune Chronicle account of execution

People convicted of murder by Ohio
American people executed for murder
People executed by Ohio by lethal injection
21st-century executions of American people
21st-century executions by Ohio
Contract killers
1975 births
2009 deaths